"All Summer Long" is a song written by Brian Wilson and Mike Love for the American rock band the Beach Boys. It was released on their 1964 album All Summer Long, and as a single in the UK in February 1965.

Composition
According to AllMusic, "All Summer Long" contains beguiling teen fantasy lyrics; the narrative catalogs a series of happy events enjoyed by a guy and his girlfriend during the summer and punctuates them with the observation "every now and then we hear our song/we been having fun all summer long."  The cheery sentiment of the lyrics carries over to the melody whose swirling bounciness provides a solid musical backdrop for the narrative's sunny tone, while its instrumental track is driven by boogie-woogie piano lines and some xylophone hooks. According to Songfacts, the instrument used is not a xylophone but rather a marimba.

Personnel
Track details courtesy of session archivist Craig Slowinski.

The Beach Boys
Al Jardine – harmony and backing vocals; electric bass guitar
Mike Love – lead and bass vocals
Brian Wilson – harmony and backing vocals, marimba; producer
Carl Wilson – harmony and backing vocals; electric rhythm guitars
Dennis Wilson – harmony and backing vocals, drums
Additional session musicians and technical staff
Chuck Britz – engineer
Steve Douglas – tenor saxophone
Jay Migliori – piccolo or fife

Variations
On disc 5 of Good Vibrations: Thirty Years of The Beach Boys, there is a version of "All Summer Long" where the backing track and the vocals are separated onto two different speakers.

Use in media
The song is featured in the 1973 film American Graffiti as the closing credits roll, although the movie is set in the summer of 1962, two years before the song's release. The song was included in the film to be a metaphor for the end of the time period that the movie celebrates. There was a comparatively fast changing of the cultural and music scene as the basic rock and roll and relative innocence of the 1950s and early 1960s in America gave way to the actual cultural end of the 1950s in America, signaled by the assassination of President John Kennedy—a popular, youthful, and charismatic president, impending American civil rights legislation, the arrival of the Beatles and their influence on America – on the popular music and style of the time, including that of Brian Wilson and the Beach Boys – as well as the beginning of American's divisive involvement in the Vietnam War and its subsequent impact, leading to the greater political involvement of young Americans, which was to then be reflected in the culture of the time. Shortly before the ending credits of the film begin, there is silence as a montage shows how Vietnam and the future directly affects certain characters in the film. The tacit, sobering reality brought to the audience at this point is made even greater when it is broken by the bright, upbeat opening xylophone of this energetic and positive Beach Boys song as the ending credits begin, with the song's nostalgic lyrics of idyllic summers past creating a certain bittersweet tone that effectively washes over the audience.
It also appears as the closing credits roll on The Simpsons episode "Summer of 4 Ft. 2". The episode makes a number of American Graffiti references.

References

External links
 
 

1964 songs
The Beach Boys songs
Songs written by Brian Wilson
Songs written by Mike Love
Song recordings produced by Brian Wilson
California Sound
Songs based on actual events